Lithuania has around 15 shopping malls with more than  square meters of space. Another two are under construction.

According to real estate firm Ober-Haus, Lithuanian shopping malls produced 6.7–8.8% investment yield in 2015. According to real estate analysts at DTZ, Lithuanian shopping malls are very well developed and competitive, but the market itself is still under-supplied. As of 2012, Vilnius was estimated to have the lowest stock in Northern Europe and the most growth potential in entire European Union. The vacancy rate of shopping centres in Vilnius has remained below 1% since 2013.

List by total floor area 
The list was last updated in 09/2021.

Gallery

See also
 List of largest shopping malls
 Lists of shopping malls

References 

Shopping malls in Lithuania
Retail buildings in Lithuania
Commercial buildings in Lithuania
Retailing in Lithuania
Retail companies of Lithuania
Lists of shopping malls
Shopping malls